The 2019–20 Albanian Women's National Championship was the 11th season of the Albanian Women's National Championship, the top Albanian women's league for association football clubs, since its establishment in 2009. The season started on 12 October 2019 and ended on 13 July 2020. The competition was suspended from 12 March to 6 June 2020, due to a pandemic of COVID-19 in Albania.

League table

Results

References

External links
Official website

2019–20
2019–20 domestic women's association football leagues
Women's National Championship
Association football events postponed due to the COVID-19 pandemic